Reem Bint Ebrahim Al Hashimy is an Emirati civil servant who is currently serving as the Minister of State for International Cooperation in the United Arab Emirates' Ministry of Foreign Affairs and International Cooperation.

Education
Al Hashimy completed her undergraduate degree at Tufts University, earning a BA in International Relations and French, followed by a Master's degree from Harvard University. She also holds a PhD from Tsinghua University.

Career
Al Hashimy began her career as Commercial Attaché, and subsequently Deputy Chief, of the UAE Embassy to the United States of America in Washington D.C.

She was appointed Minister of State in the Cabinet of the United Arab Emirates in February 2008. She was appointed to her current role as UAE Minister of State for International Cooperation in February 2016.

Al Hashimy chairs the National Committee on Sustainable Development Goals, which leads the promotion of the Sustainable Development Goals in the UAE.

Al Hashimy was formerly chair of the UAE Federal Competitiveness and Statistics Authority. She serves as Chairperson of Dubai Cares, a philanthropic organisation that aims to improve access to education in developing countries, and is the Chairperson of Sorbonne University Abu Dhabi.

In September 2022, Al Hashimy became the first female Emirati politician to deliver a speech for the UAE at the UN General Assembly.

Expo 2020 Dubai
In 2011, Al Hashimy was appointed by Sheikh Mohammed bin Rashid Al Maktoum to the role of Managing Director of the Higher Committee for Hosting the World Expo 2020.

She subsequently led the successful bid to host the first World Expo to be held in the Middle East, Africa and South Asia (MEASA) region.

In June 2014, Al Hashimy was appointed Managing Director of the Dubai Expo 2020 Higher Committee, and Director General of the Expo 2020 Dubai Bureau. The event, which was delayed by one year due to the COVID-19 pandemic, eventually welcomed 24.1 million visitors over six months between October 2021 and March 2022.

In July 2022, it was announced that Al Hashimy would continue her work as CEO of Expo City Dubai Authority, responsible for the physical and intangible legacy of Expo 2020 Dubai.

See also
List of Emiratis
Women in the Arab world
Women in the United Arab Emirates

References

External links

Her Excellency Reem Ebrahim Al Hashimy

Living people
20th-century births
Women government ministers of the United Arab Emirates
Government ministers of the United Arab Emirates
Harvard University alumni
Tufts University alumni
Tsinghua University alumni
People from Dubai
Emirati women in politics
Expo 2020